John "Johnny" Kincaid (born 4 June 1945) is a former English professional wrestler and author. He was known for wrestling during the golden age of British wrestling as he was a regular on ITV's World of Sport. Kincaid is a former European heavyweight champion.

Career

Wrestling
Kincaid started amateur boxing at the early age of 11, in his late teens he had many bouts under the IBA banner.

In July 1963 Kincaid started his career in professional wrestling. Johnny learnt his trade as a wrestler whilst he was boxing in a fair ground boxing booth. Kincaid enjoyed a career that lasted for over twenty years, he travelled the world applying his trade, he wrestled all over Europe, the Middle East, Africa, North America and in Asia including working for New Japan Pro-Wrestling in the 1970s. Kincaid won the European championship in 1980 when he defeated Rene Lasartesse in Hamburg, Germany.

Writing
Memoirs
 (2007) Johnny Kincaid: Wrestling's Ring Side Seat. AuthorHouse.
 (2009) From International Wrestler to Pubs and Punters. AuthorHouse.

Championships and accomplishments
Joint Promotions
European Heavyweight Championship (once)

References

External links
 
 Cagematch profile

1945 births
English male professional wrestlers
People from Battersea
Living people